Matt Bissonnette may refer to:

Matt Bissonnette (author), former U.S. Navy Seal who published the book No Easy Day under the pen name Mark Owen
Matt Bissonnette (director), Canadian film director and screenwriter
Matt Bissonette (musician) (born 1961), American rock musician